Taylor Pemberton (born 17 April 2003) is a professional rugby league footballer who plays as a  for North Wales Crusaders in the RFL League 1, on loan from St Helens (Heritage № 1275) in the Betfred Super League.

Playing career

St Helens
Pemberton made his first team début for Saints in April 2022 against the Castleford Tigers.

N Wales Crusaders (loan)
On 10 Feb 2023 it was announced he would join North Wales Crusaders on loan.

References

External links
St Helens profile
Saints Heritage Society profile
SL profile

2003 births
Living people
English rugby league players
North Wales Crusaders players
Rugby league hookers
St Helens R.F.C. players